Marie-Hélène Sachet (1922–1986) was a French botanist. In 1966, she commenced work at the Smithsonian Institution, rising to the position of curator of botany at the National Museum of Natural History.

References

1922 births
1986 deaths
20th-century French botanists